Scarsdale High School (SHS) is a public high school in Scarsdale, New York, United States, a coterminous town and village in Westchester County, New York. It is a part of the Scarsdale Union Free School District.

The school was founded in 1917. In its first selection process, the United States Department of Education named Scarsdale High School as "one of the 144 exemplary schools to which others may look for patterns of success." According to a study done for U.S. News & World Report, Scarsdale High School is in the nation's top 100 for math and science. In 1983 the school was awarded the National Blue Ribbon Award.

From the graduating class of 2017, 98% continued their education with college programs, and 97% entered four-year national and international colleges and universities. Thirteen students in the class of 2017 (3%) were named National Merit Scholarship Semifinalists, and 27 (7%) students received National Merit Letters of commendation. Between 2007 and 2009, Scarsdale High School made a transition from Advanced Placement (AP) to Advanced Topics (AT) courses.

In the 2017–18 school year, SHS had a professional staff of 156 with a median teaching experience of 19 years. 99% of the faculty held a master's degree, 81% had 30 credits or more beyond a master's, and 4% had doctorate degrees. The student faculty ratio is 11.66 to 1, and its teachers have one of the highest paying salaries in the country: 44% had a base-salary of over $100,000 in 2005.

The school is 14.7% Asian, 1.4% Black, 7.8% Hispanic, 68.4% White and 5.7% other.

Ethnic populations

Japanese 

Around 1986 only 5% of the school was of Asian origins. By 1991 large numbers of Japanese students enrolled at Scarsdale High because their fathers, on business assignments from Japanese companies, moved to Scarsdale for the quality of the schools. By that year almost 20% of the students were of Asian origins, most of them were of Japanese ancestry and a few being of Chinese and Korean origins. The school established an English as a second language (ESL) program to help Japanese students adjust. Initially the Japanese students faced hostility from many of the American students, and some Japanese students had hostility towards classmates they felt were becoming too Americanized and/or socialized too much with Americans. Therefore, the Japanese and American students socialized separately. Principal Judy Fox formed the Multicultural Steering Committee to try to resolve racial tensions within the school.

Chinese 
According to the 2010 census, around 5.9% of the population is of Chinese origin. Based on information provided by the Scarsdale Chinese Association, (SCA) many of these people came to America after college for better job opportunities. They eventually settled in the US, and when they had children, decided to live in Scarsdale for the proximity to train stations going to New York City, and for the schools. Mandarin is now taught in Scarsdale High School, with the possibility of being integrated into the Scarsdale Middle School world language curriculum as well.

Notable alumni
Jacqueline Alemany (2007), journalist
Eric Alterman (1978), Nation columnist
Jacob M. Appel (1992), author and bioethics scholar
Nan Aron (1966), civil rights advocate, public interest lawyer
Nancy Atlas (1967), United States federal judge
Greg M. Behrman (1994), author; Henry Kissinger Fellow for Foreign Policy at The Aspen Institute; founder, editor and CEO of NationSwell
Dan Biederman (1971), urban management pioneer
Leslie Cannold (1983), author, commentator, ethicist, activist
 Nick Civetta (2007), rugby lock/flanker
Lizabeth Cohen (1969), historian, scholar
Lydia Cornell (as Lydia Korniloff) (1971), actress
Laura Dave (1995), novelist
Lisa Donovan (1998), actress
Robert Durst (1961), murderer, son of Seymour Durst and real estate heir
John S. Dyson (1961), businessman
Nicole Eisenman (1983), visual artist
Eve Ensler (1971), playwright, performer, activist
David Feldshuh (1961), physician, dramatist, artistic director at Cornell University
Tovah Feldshuh (1966), actress
Rob Fishman (2004), entrepreneur and writer
Richard Foreman (1955), playwright, avant-garde theater pioneer
David Galef (1977), novelist, short story writer
Lindsay Gottlieb (1995), Cleveland Cavaliers assistant coach
Gordon Gould (1938), physicist credited with inventing laser
Earl G. Graves Jr. (1980), basketball player
Ross Greenburg (1973), executive for HBO Sports
Peter Grosz (1992), actor
Jonathan Haidt (1981), social psychologist
Jeffrey Hoffman (1962), astronaut
Richard Holbrooke (1958), diplomat
Heather H. Howard (1986), health policy expert and political advisor
Yanni Hufnagel (2001), college basketball coach
Roger Hull  (1960), Educator, Administrator, Lawyer <cite web/url=https://en.wikipedia.org/wiki/Roger_Harold_Hull
Andy Jassy (1986), CEO of Amazon
Gish Jen (1974), novelist
Kenneth I. Juster (1972), government official, lawyer
Brewster Kahle (1978), founder of the Internet Archive and Wayback Machine
Matthew Kahn (1984), environmental economics scholar
Bob Kauffman (1964), professional basketball player
Alison Knowles (1951), artist
Zach Kornfeld (2008), YouTube personality and member of The Try Guys
Barbara Kopple (1964), documentary film director
Richard Kostelanetz (1958), writer and visual artist
Glenn Kramon (1971), journalist, assistant managing editor of The New York Times
Robert Kuttner (1961), journalist, editor
David Lascher (1990), actor
Cinzi Lavin (attended 1981–83), musical dramatist, writer
John Leventhal (1970), musician, producer, songwriter, recording engineer
Mara Liasson (1973), National Public Radio correspondent
Cabot Lyford (1942), sculptor
Charles S. Maier (1956), professor of history at Harvard University
Michael Mark (1968), musician/composer
Linda McCartney (1960), photographer, wife of Paul McCartney
Liza Minnelli (attended 1961–62, did not graduate), singer, actor
Rick Moser (1974), NFL football player, actor
Ethan Nadelmann (1975), writer and advocate on drug policy reform
 Nadine Netter (born 1944), tennis player
Charles Newirth (1973), film producer
Jack Newkirk (1932), naval aviator
Judith Newman (1977), journalist and author
Suzanne Nossel (1987), non-profit executive and human rights activist
Emily Nussbaum (1984), journalist
Dan O'Brien (1992), playwright, poet, librettist, essayist
Jon Oringer (1992), entrepreneur and the founder of the popular microstock photography site Shutterstock
Cathryn Jakobson Ramin (1975), journalist and writer
Victoria Redel (1976), poet, fiction writer, professor at Sarah Lawrence College
Bryan Reynolds (1983), playwright, Shakespeare scholar
Thomas E. Ricks (1973), journalist
Tom Rogers (1972), media executive
Dan Rosensweig (1979), business executive, CEO of Chegg
Elisabeth Rosenthal (1974), physician, journalist for The New York Times
Cynthia E. Rosenzweig (1966), climatologist
Douglas Rushkoff (1979), media theorist, writer, columnist, lecturer, graphic novelist and documentarian
David Rusk (1958), author and consultant on regional strategies for metropolitan areas, former mayor of Albuquerque, member of the New Mexico legislature
Daniel Schacter (1970), psychologist
Noah Schnapp (2022), actor in Stranger Things and The Peanuts Movie
Carl Emil Schorske (1932), cultural historian
Christopher M. Schroeder (1982), entrepreneur
Alan Schwarz (1986), sportswriter
John E. Schwarz (1957), political scientist, distinguished senior fellow at Demos
DJ Shiftee (2004), DJ, turntablist, born Samuel Morris Zornow
Cevin Soling (1984), filmmaker, musician, and writer
Aaron Sorkin (1979), screenwriter
Andrew Ross Sorkin (1995), journalist
Richard Stengel (1973), editor of Time magazine
Roderick Stephens (1927), sailor
Carolyn Strauss (1981), television executive and producer
George Sugihara (1968), theoretical biologist
Ivan Sutherland (1955), Internet pioneer
Ojetta Rogeriee Thompson (1969), judge
Nina Totenberg (1962), journalist, NPR legal affairs correspondent
James Traub (1972), journalist
Gary Trauner (1979), Wyoming politician
Florence Wald (1934), nurse, professor, administrator
John Wallach (1960), journalist, author, editor, founder of Seeds of Peace
Ellen Weiss (1977), radio executive
Bob Wilber (1945), jazz clarinetist, saxophonist, band leader
Harris Wofford (1944), United States Senator from Pennsylvania
George Zimmer (1966), entrepreneur

References

External links

Scarsdale Alumni Association website
Scarsdale High School Maroon, student newspaper website

Public high schools in Westchester County, New York
Educational institutions established in 1917
Scarsdale, New York
1917 establishments in New York (state)